Bikini Kill is an American punk rock band formed in Olympia, Washington, in October 1990. The group originally consisted of singer and songwriter Kathleen Hanna, guitarist Billy Karren, bassist Kathi Wilcox, and drummer Tobi Vail. The band pioneered the riot grrrl movement, with feminist lyrics and fiery performances. Their music is characteristically abrasive and hardcore-influenced. After two full-length albums, several EPs and two compilations, they disbanded in 1997. The band reunited for tours in 2019 and 2022, with Erica Dawn Lyle on guitar in place of Karren.

Career
Bikini Kill formed in Olympia, Washington, in October 1990, by Kathleen Hanna (vocals), Billy Karren (guitar), Kathi Wilcox (bass), and Tobi Vail (drums). Hanna, Vail, and Wilcox met while attending The Evergreen State College in Washington. Hanna also published a fanzine called Bikini Kill for their first tours in 1991. The band wrote songs together and encouraged a female-centric environment at their shows, urging women to come to the front of the stage and handing out lyric sheets to them. Hanna would also dive into the crowd to personally remove male hecklers. Such male concertgoers would often verbally and physically assault Hanna during shows when the tickets were still inexpensive and easily procured. However, the band's reach included large male audiences as well as young women.

Fellow riot grrrl musician Lois Maffeo originally adopted Bikini Kill as a band name, inspired by the 1967 B-movie The Million Eyes of Sumuru. She and her friend Margaret Doherty used the name for a one-off performance in the late 1980s where they donned faux fur punk cave girl costumes. Vail liked the name and appropriated it after Maffeo settled on the band name Cradle Robbers.

After an independent demo cassette, Revolution Girl Style Now, Bikini Kill released the Bikini Kill EP on the indie label Kill Rock Stars.  Produced by Ian MacKaye of Minor Threat and Fugazi, the album began to establish the band's audience. The band's debut album, Pussy Whipped, was released in September 1993. Bikini Kill toured in London, England to begin working with Huggy Bear, releasing a split album, Our Troubled Youth / Yeah Yeah Yeah Yeah, and touring the UK. The tour was the subject of a documentary film by Lucy Thane titled It Changed My Life: Bikini Kill in the U.K. Upon their return to the United States, the band began working with Joan Jett of the Runaways, whose music Hanna described as an early example of the Riot Grrrl aesthetic. Jett produced the single "New Radio"/"Rebel Girl" for the band, and Hanna co-wrote several songs on Jett's Pure and Simple album.

By the following year, Riot Grrrl was receiving constant attention in the media, and Bikini Kill were increasingly referred to as pioneers of the movement. Hanna called for a "media blackout" amongst Riot Grrrls, as they felt the band and the movement were being misrepresented by the media. The pioneer reputation endures but, as Hanna recalls, "[Bikini Kill was] very vilified during the '90s by so many people, and hated by so many people, and I think that that's been kind of written out of the history. People were throwing chains at our heads – people hated us – and it was really, really hard to be in that band."

The band's final album, Reject All American, was released in 1996. After the band's breakup in 1997, a compilation of singles recorded between 1993 and 1995 was released in 1998 under the name The Singles.

Post-breakup
During the summer of 1992, the band The Frumpies was formed by Karren, Wilcox, Vail, and Molly Neuman of Bratmobile, and toured as late as the early 2000s along with a similar Italian punk rock band Dada Swing.

Vail, notorious for her numerous side projects and being in several bands at a time, later resurfaced in a band called Spider and the Webs, and played with the Old Haunts until the band broke up in 2009. Kathi Wilcox played in The Casual Dots, who released only one album to date, and Billy Karren played in Ghost Mom. Hanna first contributed to an LP called 'Real Fiction' as a member of the Fakes, and then turned to more dance-based new wave music (with similar feminist lyrical themes) on her solo debut, Julie Ruin. She then became a member of the political new wave outfit Le Tigre. After Le Tigre broke up, Hanna became the front woman of a band named after her solo project, the Julie Ruin, for which Wilcox plays bass.

In February 2016, a pro-Hillary Clinton clip utilizing the Bikini Kill song "Rebel Girl" began to go viral, but was taken down by Vail (who supported Bernie Sanders in the primary).

Reunions
Early in 2020, in an interview with Pitchfork, Hanna stated that the band had no plans at the time to create new material. However, they have united for several tours since 2017.

2017
In 2017, Kathleen Hanna, Kathi Wilcox and Tobi Vail reunited to play one song at a book-release concert for Jenn Pelly’s book about the Raincoats.

2019–2022
On January 15, 2019, Bikini Kill announced four U.S. shows, in New York and Los Angeles. The lineup for these shows included Hanna, Wilcox, Tobi Vail and touring guitarist Erica Dawn Lyle, who replaced Billy Karren in the lineup. The first show was April 25 at the Hollywood Palladium with Alice Bag as opener.

In June the band played two European dates, in London at Brixton Academy, supported by Big Joanie, and with the Tuts and Child's Pose opening. On September 15, they headlined the third day of the Riot Fest event in Chicago.

On November 6, 2019, Bikini Kill announced a thirteen-date North American Tour for 2020, beginning in Olympia, Washington. The lineup for these shows was the same for the previous dates in 2019, and was scheduled to start March 13, 2020 at Olympia's Capitol Theater. The remainder of the West Coast tour included shows in Victoria, B.C., where they were to be supported by Mecca Normal, and in Portland supported by the Lithics. The tour also included some European dates in June and August, including Oslo's Øya Festival. The tour was rescheduled to 2022 in the wake of the COVID-19 pandemic.

2023
In October 2022 the band announced an Australian tour for March 2023, their first Australian shows in 26 years, touring to Hobart, Brisbane, Adelaide, Melbourne, the Golden Plains Festival in country Victoria, Perth and at the Sydney Opera House. Hanna, Wilcox and Vail were joined by touring guitarist Sara Landeau, who played with both Hanna and Wilcox in The Julie Ruin. Vail also fell ill for part of the tour, leaving the band's Australian drum tech Lauren Hammel (also of Tropical Fuck Storm) to fill in on drums for the Victorian shows.

Members
Current members
 Kathleen Hanna – lead vocals (1990–1997, 2017, 2019–present), bass guitar (1990–1991; occasional 1991–1997, 2017, 2019–present)
 Kathi Wilcox – bass guitar, backing vocals, occasional drums (1991–1997, 2017, 2019–present), guitar (1990–1991; occasional 1991–1997, 2017, 2019–present)
 Tobi Vail – drums, occasional lead vocals (1990–1997, 2017, 2019–present)

Current touring musicians
 Sara Landeau – guitar, occasional bass guitar (2022–present)

Former members
 Billy Karren – guitar, occasional bass guitar (1991–1997)

Former touring musicians
 Erica Dawn Lyle – guitar, occasional bass guitar (2019, 2022)
 Lauren Hammel – drums (2023)

Timeline

Discography

Revolution Girl Style Now cassette (self-released) (1991)
Yeah Yeah Yeah Yeah LP (Kill Rock Stars) (1993) - Split with Huggy Bear
Pussy Whipped (Kill Rock Stars) (1993)
Reject All American (Kill Rock Starts) (1996)
The Singles CD (Kill Rock Stars/Bikini Kill) (1998/2018) - Reissue also available as a 12" EP

See also
 DIY ethic
 Ladyfest

References

External links

Kathleen Hanna's Bikini Kill Archive at WordPress.com
Bikini Kill at tigerbomb.net
Bikini Kill at Rolling Stone
Hanna And Her Sisters at The New Yorker
Kathleen Hanna Papers in the Riot Grrrl Collection at Fales Library & Special Collections at New York University Special Collections

Kill Rock Stars
Punk rock groups from Washington (state)
Musical groups from Olympia, Washington
Radical feminism
Riot grrrl bands
Third-wave feminism
Musical groups established in 1990
Musical groups disestablished in 1997
Musical groups reestablished in 2019
Musical quartets
Feminist musicians
American women in electronic music